Marcos Guilherme de Almeida Santos Matos (born 5 August 1995), known as Marcos Guilherme, is a Brazilian professional footballer who plays as a winger for Russian Premier League club Khimki.

Club career

Atlético Paranaense
Born in Itararé, São Paulo, Marcos Guilherme joined Atlético Paranaense's youth setup in 2008, aged 13. He made his senior debuts with the club's reserves in 2013 Campeonato Paranaense, scoring his first senior goal on 14 March, in a 2–0 home win against Nacional-PR.

Marcos Guilherme was promoted to the main squad in 2014, and made his Série A debut on 20 April 2014, starting in a 1–0 home win against Grêmio. He scored his first goal on 10 May, netting the first of a 1–2 away loss against Internacional.

On 5 September 2014, Marcos Guilherme extended his link with Furacão until 2018. He finished his debut year as the club's top scorer and player with most caps, with 11 goals in 54 matches.

Dinamo Zagreb (loan)
In January 2017, Croatian club GNK Dinamo Zagreb announced that Marcos Guillherme signed for the club on loan until the end of the season. He contributed with 11 league appearances, and helped the side to reach the Final of the Croatian Football Cup, where they lost to HNK Rijeka.

São Paulo (loan)
On 20 July 2017, Marcos Guilherme joined São Paulo on loan until the end of 2018. He made his debut for the club nine days later, coming on as a second-half substitute for Petros and scoring twice in a 4–3 away win against Botafogo.

Marcos Guilherme became a regular starter for the club, featuring in every match of the 2017 campaign after his arrival, but left the club on 3 June 2018 after São Paulo could not reach an agreement with Atlético for a permanent transfer.

Al-Wehda
On 9 June 2018, Marcos Guilherme signed for Saudi Professional League club Al-Wehda. A regular starter in his first season, he was only sparingly used in his second before leaving.

Internacional
On 12 January 2020, Marcos Guilherme agreed to a two-year deal with Internacional.

Santos (loan)
On 27 May 2021, Marcos Guilherme moved to Santos on a loan deal until June 2022. A regular starter under managers Fernando Diniz and Fábio Carille, he often played outside of his main position before losing his starting spot after the arrival of new manager Fabián Bustos.

Return to São Paulo
On 21 June 2022, after terminating his contract with Internacional, Marcos Guilherme agreed to return to São Paulo.

Khimki
On 9 February 2023, Guilherme signed a year-and-a-half contract with Russian Premier League club FC Khimki.

International career
Marcos Guilherme was called up by Alexandre Gallo to Brazil under-20 team for the 2015 South American Youth Football Championship. He finished the competition being his side's top scorer, with four goals under his name.

Career statistics

Honours
Atlético Paranaense
 Campeonato Paranaense: 2016

References

External links
Atlético Paranaense profile 

1995 births
Footballers from São Paulo (state)
Living people
Brazilian footballers
Brazil youth international footballers
Brazil under-20 international footballers
Association football wingers
Club Athletico Paranaense players
GNK Dinamo Zagreb players
São Paulo FC players
Al-Wehda Club (Mecca) players
Sport Club Internacional players
Santos FC players
FC Khimki players
Campeonato Brasileiro Série A players
Croatian Football League players
First Football League (Croatia) players
Saudi Professional League players
Russian Premier League players
2015 South American Youth Football Championship players
Brazilian expatriate footballers
Brazilian expatriate sportspeople in Croatia
Expatriate footballers in Croatia
Brazilian expatriate sportspeople in Saudi Arabia
Expatriate footballers in Saudi Arabia
Brazilian expatriate sportspeople in Russia
Expatriate footballers in Russia